Some Cocktail Suggestions is an EP by Steel Pole Bath Tub, released on November 8, 1994 by Boner Records.

Track listing

Personnel 
Adapted from the Some Cocktail Suggestions liner notes.

Steel Pole Bath Tub
 Dale Flattum – bass guitar, vocals
 Mike Morasky – guitar, vocals
 Darren Morey (as D.K. Mor-X) – drums, vocals

Additional musicians
 Paul Reller – saxophone
Production and additional personnel
Steve Albini – production, engineering

Release history

References

External links 
 

1994 EPs
Steel Pole Bath Tub albums
Albums produced by Steve Albini